The Orto Botanico dell'Università di Cagliari (5 hectares), also known as the Orto Botanico di Cagliari, is a botanical garden operated by the University of Cagliari and located at Viale S. Ignazio da Laconi 9-11, Cagliari, Sardinia, Italy.

The garden was inaugurated in 1866 under the direction of Prof. Patrizio Gennari. Its first seed index was published in 1885, and by 1901 the garden contained some 430 species (of which 36 were killed by that year's deep frost). The garden was damaged in World War II but has subsequently been restored.

Today the garden contains some 2000 species, predominantly of Mediterranean origin but with a good collection of succulents and tropical plants as well. The garden is organized into three major sections:

 Mediterranean plants – representing the three bands of Sardinian vegetation as well as species from Australia, California, Chile, etc.
 Succulent plants – about 1000 succulents from Echinocereus, Euphorbia, Lampranthus, Mammillaria, Opuntia, etc., in a greenhouse and outdoors, roughly equally divided between African and American origin. 
 Tropical plants.

All told, the garden contains some 600 trees and 550 shrubs. Of particular interest is its palm collection (4000 m²), with 60 specimens representing 16 species, and a magnificent specimen of Euphorbia canariensis spreading across 100 m². The site also contains ancient Roman cisterns and natural caves.

See also
 List of botanical gardens in Italy

References 
 Centro Conservazione Biodiversità - Virtual Orto (Italian)
 Orto Botanico di Cagliari
 Horti entry (Italian)
 Cavara F., L'Orto Botanico di Cagliari come Giardino di acclimatazione e come Istituto Scientifico, 1900.
 Chiappini M., "L'Orto Botanico della Università di Cagliari nel I Centenario della Fondazione (15 novembre 1866)", Giorn. Bot. Ital., 73: 266–272, 1966.
 Gennari P., Guida dell'Orto Botanico della R. Università di Cagliari, Tip. Edit. dell'Avvenire di Sardegna, Cagliari, 1874.
 Mameli-Calvino E., Orto Botanico dell'Università di Cagliari, 1928.
 Mossa L. and Del Prete C., L'Orto Botanico dell'Università di Cagliari, S.T.ASS., Palermo, 1992.

Cagliari
Botanical gardens in Italy
Gardens in Sardinia